Gowin Knight FRS  (10 September 1713 – 8 June 1772) was a British physicist who, in 1745, discovered a process for producing strongly magnetised steel. He also served as the first principal librarian of the British Museum.

Biography
Born in Corringham, a small parish in Lincolnshire, Knight was educated at Leeds Grammar School and Magdalen Hall, Oxford. He was awarded a BA in October 1736, MA in June 1739 and MB in February 1742, after which he lived in London as a practising physician.

In 1745, he discovered a process for forming strongly magnetised steel, which he used to develop a compass needle able to function with greater precision. He was elected a Fellow of the Royal Society the same year after presenting his findings to the Society. He was honoured in 1747 with the Copley Medal in recognition of his achievements and, by 1752, his technologically advanced compasses were adopted by the Royal Navy, with renowned London instrument craftsman, George Adams, engaged in their manufacture.

In 1756, Knight received an appointment as the first principal librarian of the British Museum. He died in London, three months before his 59th birthday.

References

Capsule biography of Gowin Knight at Science & Society Picture Library website
Gowin Knight entry at the Encyclopædia Britannica Online

1713 births
1772 deaths
People from West Lindsey District
Alumni of Magdalen College, Oxford
18th-century English people
English physicists
English inventors
English librarians
Fellows of the Royal Society
Directors of the British Museum
Employees of the British Museum
Recipients of the Copley Medal